Grunewald is a locality (Ortsteil) within the Berlin borough (Bezirk) of Charlottenburg-Wilmersdorf. Famous for the homonymous forest, until 2001 administrative reform it was part of the former district of Wilmersdorf.

Next to Lichterfelde West, Dahlem and Westend, it is part of the affluent Berlin "Villenbogen", a row of 19th century suburbs completely made up of mansions.

Geography
The locality is situated in the western side of the city and is separated from Spandau by the river Havel. It borders with the localities of Westend, Halensee, Schmargendorf, Wilhelmstadt, Gatow (both in Spandau district), Nikolassee, Zehlendorf and Dahlem (all three in Steglitz-Zehlendorf district). The Grunewald forest is 10 km away from Berlin-Mitte (Germany's capital).

History

Etymology
The name derives from the Grunewald hunting lodge of 1543, the oldest preserved castle in Berlin, which is, however, officially located  within the adjacent Dahlem locality. It was erected in an Early Renaissance style by order of Elector Joachim II Hector of Brandenburg and named Zum Gruenen Wald, the umlaut spelt with a following "e" instead of a diacritic as depicted above the main entrance. A corduroy road leading from the Berlin Stadtschloss to the lodge was laid out, which later would be known as the Kurfürstendamm boulevard.

Overview

The neighbourhood developed out of a so-called "mansion colony" at the western end of the Kurfürstendamm. Promoted by Otto von Bismarck, Grunewald was found to be a preferred residential area from the 1880s onward. Grunewald was incorporated into Greater Berlin in 1920. Today, the social structure of Grunewald is still influenced by these origins. The Rot-Weiss Tennis Club, home of the WTA Tour German Open, has been located in the district since 1897.

On June 24, 1922 Foreign Minister of Germany Walther Rathenau was assassinated by ultra-nationalist radicals of the Organisation Consul in a curve of the main street called Koenigsallee. A memorial stone marks the scene of the crime.

Since 1981 the Grunewald district is the home of the Institute for Advanced Study, Berlin. It also houses the embassies of Afghanistan, Azerbaijan, Qatar, Kuwait, Laos, North Macedonia, Poland and Serbia.

Within the Grunewald forest lies the artificial Teufelsberg hill, once a listening station of the US National Security Agency. At the shore of the Havel the Grunewaldturm, built by Franz Heinrich Schwechten in 1898, offers panoramic views over the Havelland region.

Deportation memorial

Between October 1941 and February 1945 more than 50,000 Jews were deported by German Nazis to extermination camps from the Grunewald freight railway station and murdered. Memorials from the district of Charlottenburg-Wilmersdorf and the Deutsche Bahn ("Gleis 17") commemorate this spot in Grunewald's history. The area is accessible by the Berlin-Grunewald station.

Transport 
Grunewald railway station is served by the S7 line of the Berlin S-Bahn, which connects the locality to Berlin Mitte, Ahrensfelde and Potsdam. 

The M19, M29, X10, N10, 110, 115, 186, 249, 310 and 349 bus lines all run through or terminate within the Grunewald locality.  

One of Germany's busiest freeways, the AVUS Autobahn, runs through the locality and was used as a marathon and bike path during the 1936 Summer Olympics.

Mansions (choice)

Notable residents

 Fritz Ascher, Bismarckallee 26
 Berthold Auerbach, Auerbacher Straße
 Ingeborg Bachmann, Hasensprung 2, Koenigsallee 35
 Vicki Baum, Koenigsallee 43–45
 Walter Benjamin, Delbrückstraße 23
 Dietrich Bonhoeffer, Wangenheimstraße 14
 Arno Breker, Koenigsallee 65
 Isadora Duncan
 Lion Feuchtwanger, Regerstraße
 Samuel von Fischer, Erdener Straße 8
 Carl Fürstenberg, Koenigsallee 53
 Maximilian Harden, Wernerstraße 16
 Gerhart Hauptmann, Trabener Straße, Hubertusallee
 Heinrich Himmler, Hagenstraße 22
 Engelbert Humperdinck, Trabener Straße
 Harald Juhnke, Richard-Strauss-Straße 26, Lassenstraße 1
 Helmut Käutner, Koenigsallee 18g
 Alfred Kerr, Gneiststraße 9, Höhmannstraße 6, Douglasstraße 10
 Harry Graf Kessler, Höhmannstraße 6
 Hildegard Knef, Bettinastraße 12, Brahmsstraße 12
 Else Lasker-Schüler, Humboldtstraße 13
 Otto Lessing (sculptor), Wangenheimstraße 10
 Brigitte Mira, Koenigsallee 83
 Friedrich Olbricht, Wildpfad
 Ernst Oppler and Alexander Oppler, Hagenstraße 8
 Max Pechstein,
 Max Planck, Wangenheimstraße 21
 Walther Rathenau, Koenigsallee 65
 Max Reinhardt, Fontanestraße 8
 Ferdinand Sauerbruch, Herthastraße 11
 Ulrich Schamoni, Furtwänglerstraße 19
 Romy Schneider, Winkler Straße 22
 Angelika Schrobsdorff, Johannaplatz 3
 Werner Sombart, Humboldtstraße 35a
 Hermann Sudermann, Bettinastraße 3
 Grethe Weiser, Herthastraße 17a

Transportation
Grunewald has access to the Berlin S-Bahn network at the Berlin-Grunewald station (lines S7).

Forest

The forest of Grunewald, located mainly in the quarter but also in Nikolassee, Zehlendorf, and in a minor percentage in Dahlem and Westend is, with 3,000 ha, the greatest green area in the city of Berlin.

See also
Grunewald Railway Station
Holocaust Memorial "Track 17" at Grunewald station

References

External links
 

Localities of Berlin

1880 establishments in Germany